The Borax Lake chub (Siphateles boraxobius) is a rare cyprinid fish found only in outflows and pools around Borax Lake, a small lake of the Alvord basin, Harney County, Oregon.

The back is generally a dark olive green, while the sides are silvery, with a dark line extending from gill cover to tail, and a scattering of dark melanophores. The fins are colorless, with more melanophores on the rays of the dorsal fin and tail, as well as on the first four rays of the pectoral fins. Similar in many ways to the Alvord chub, the Borax Lake species has a longer, wider, and deeper head, and larger eyes, and the caudal peduncle is more slender.

The Borax Lake chub eats a variety of foods, including midge larvae, diatoms, copepods, ostracods, and terrestrial insects. Its preferred mode of feeding is to root around in the bottom, but it will go after floating material or feed from the surface if necessary.

This species is the sole fish inhabiting the Borax Lake waters. The fish avoid the warmest water, favoring lake's outflows. Its continued existence was threatened by geothermal energy development near the lake, which dried up part of the chub's habitat. However, in 2000 the Steens Mountain Cooperative Management and Protection Act put the area around the lake off-limits to geothermal exploration and mining.

References

  Listed as Vulnerable (VU D2 v3.1)
 
 William F. Sigler and John W. Sigler, Fishes of the Great Basin (Reno: University of Nevada Press, 1987), pp. 170–173
 

Borax Lake
Siphateles
Endemic fauna of Oregon
Fish of the Western United States
Freshwater fish of the United States
Natural history of Oregon
Fish described in 1980
ESA endangered species